Feliksas Jakubauskas  (born 14 October 1949 in Šoliškės) is a Lithuanian textile artist.

Biography 
In 1974–1976, he studied textiles at the Lithuanian Institute of Art, 1976–1980, and at The Budapest Academy of Applied Arts. In 1981–1989, he worked as an artist of individual designers clothing factory, "daisy" in Vilnius.

Major works
 Glass beads game, 1985
 Above the valley of my black cloud, 1987
 Old cloth, 1987
 Butterfly mm fan, the World Bank, Washington, 1992
 Rain in a sunny meadow, 1995
 Touch the gray cloud, 1997
 Day night, 2004
 Raw nocturne, Triptych, 2000
 The sky is black - green sky, Triptych, 2002
 Golden Baroque Vilnius, Diptych, 2003–2004,
 The two worlds of Matthew, diptych, 2004

Since 1980, he has shown in more than 170 exhibitions in Lithuania and abroad.

Individual exhibitions
 Bergen - 1991
 Vilnius - 1992, 1995–1997, 1999, 2001, 2005
 Kaunas - 1998, 1999, 2003, 2010
 Nida, Moscow - 1999
 Lodz, Poland - 2001
 Kedainiai - 2004

His works to Lithuanian Art Museum, the Lithuanian National Museum, National Museum of Fine Arts Čiurlionis

Awards
 1997 - International Biennial, Pittsburgh, Ohio - Grand Prix
 1998 - Lithuanian National Prize
 1998 - International Textile Triennial, Lodz, Poland - silver medal
 2003 - Cheongju International Craft Biennale, Korea - Gold Dragon statue

See also
List of Lithuanian painters

References

This article was initially translated from Lithuanian wikipedia

Lithuanian painters
1949 births
Living people
Artists from Vilnius
Recipients of the Lithuanian National Prize
Vilnius Academy of Arts alumni